The Alamo bolide impact occurred 377–378 million years ago, when one or more hypervelocity objects from space slammed into shallow marine waters at a site that is now the Devonian Guilmette Formation of the Worthington Mountains and Schell Creek Range of southeastern Nevada; the event is named for breccias of metamorphosed crushed rock deposits, found near the town of Alamo, Nevada (the "Alamo Breccia"). This catastrophic impact event resulted in what is one of the best-exposed and has become the most accurately dated impact events; it occurred within the Frasnian age of the Devonian at about 377-378 Ma, a moment in time that was about 5.9 Ma prior to the Frasnian/Famennian extinction events, which it is unlikely to have affected.

The actual impact site has not yet been significantly documented—even its precise diameter and its internal structural features are not yet clear enough to make speculations on the mass and trajectory genuinely useful. Insufficient detail does not permit a precise reconstruction of the Devonian paleogeography, beyond the fact that it was a "wet-target" impact in a reef front where carbonates were being built up in marine shallows.

The impact site contains megabreccia of gigantic displaced blocks, together with several attributes familiar from other impact sites: shocked quartz, elevated iridium levels, and spherical  lapilli. John E. Warme, one of the geologists who first recognized the geologic anomalies as the results of a bolide, estimates that the total volume of limestone reef deposits and bedrock that was smashed, deformed, partially melted or shifted during the Alamo event at 1,000 cubic kilometers. "Ensuing tsunamis rearranged much of the debris" he adds.

After initial resistance from the Geological Society of America, the first paper published concerning the Alamo Breccia was co-authored by John Warme, Brian Ackman, Yarmanto, and Alan Chamberlain in the 1993 Nevada Petroleum Society Field Conference Guidebook.

See also 
Pahranagat Valley

References

J.A. Pinto and J.E. Warme, "Alamo impact crater documented", 2006. in Lunar and Planetary Science 37  (pdf file)
Brian Ackman, "The early history of the Alamo Breccia" Bibliography

Geology of Nevada
Geology of Utah
Devonian impact craters
Impact craters of the United States
Landforms of Lincoln County, Nevada
Landforms of Utah